Ephraim Cleveland House is an American historic home in the town of Naples in Ontario County, New York. It was built in the vernacular Federal style around 1794, and was expanded in the 1840s and '50s. It is a two-story, five-bay dwelling, and possesses a distinctive Federal-style entrance, featuring a paneled door with half sidelights and a blind elliptical fanlight.

It has been listed on the National Register of Historic Places since 1994.

Gallery

References

External links

Historic American Buildings Survey in New York (state)
Houses on the National Register of Historic Places in New York (state)
Federal architecture in New York (state)
Houses in Ontario County, New York
National Register of Historic Places in Ontario County, New York